Amatitán is the head of a municipality in the Mexican state of Jalisco, and is home to one of the world's largest tequila distilleries.

It is the location of “La Hacienda de San José del Refugio”, a distillery which makes “Tequila Herradura” and “Tequila Jimador” and is the main source of employment for the residents of the town and surrounding communities.

The Town of Amatitán is the administrative center for the "Municipio de Amatitán" which also includes the surrounding communities of Santiaguito, Villa de Cuerámbaro, Chome, La Mata, La Conchilla, El Amarrilo, Agua Fría, Santa Rosa and several other smaller settlements.

Amatitán can also be reached from Guadalajara by car driving north on Mexican Federal Highway 15, it is a drive of about 45 minutes and the road is kept in fairly good shape.

The economy of the municipality of Amatitán, like that of the surrounding areas, relies heavily in the production of tequila beverage. Its agriculture is dominated by the cultivation of the agave plant, which is used to produce the tequila. The climate in Amatitán is hot and dry which suits the agave plant well. There is usually one rainy period during the year that lasts from June through September, when most of the residents grow their other dominant crop, corn, which requires significantly more water.  There is virtually no artificial irrigation in the area and most farmers still depend on rainwater for the irrigation of their fields. Some residents also raise cattle and other livestock, mainly for regional consumption. The lifestyle of its inhabitants is mostly of a rural nature and the residents are mostly Catholic. Some commute daily or weekly to Guadalajara for employment. The area is also a source of immigrants to the United States, most of whom settle in California.

Government

Municipal presidents

References

Municipalities of Jalisco